Torrance "Tank" Daniels (born December 27, 1981) is a former professional American football linebacker who is currently a football Coach at Don Bosco Prep in Ramsey, New Jersey. He was signed by the Philadelphia Eagles as an undrafted free agent in 2006. He currently resides in New Jersey and is married to Melinda Daniels (formally Ginnotti) where they have 2 children, Tank Rocco and Michael Jesse James Daniels.

Daniels has also played for the New York Giants, Jacksonville Jaguars, and Hartford Colonials. He earned a Super Bowl ring with the Giants in XLII against the New England Patriots.

Early years
Daniels was an All-State performer in football as a quarterback during his sophomore and junior seasons and as a wide receiver as a senior. He earned All-State honors in baseball as a shortstop, in basketball as a power forward, and in track competing in the hurdles, sprint relays, and long jump.

College career
He was a two-time All-America honoree, compiled 237 tackles, 34.0 TFL, 17.5 sacks, and 7 interceptions in his career at Harding University. He earned Associated Press Little All-America honors as a senior. As a freshman, Daniels had 30 tackles, 4.5 for loss, 2.5 sacks, and an interception. He had his best overall season as a sophomore, finishing with 69 tackles, 13.5 for loss, seven sacks, two picks, and four forced fumbles. Daniels continued his standout play in 2004, posting 64 tackles, six for a loss and 3.5 sacks and a career high four interceptions on the season. He concluded his career with a career high 74 tackles, 10 for loss, 4.5 sacks, and four forced fumbles. The four-year starter was twice named All-American, forced 10 fumbles during his career, and averaged 26 yards per interception return.

Professional career

First stint with Philadelphia Eagles
After being undrafted in the 2006 NFL Draft, Daniels signed with the Philadelphia Eagles where he was on the practice squad. The Eagles signed Daniels from their practice squad after placing quarterback Donovan McNabb on the injured reserve list. He made his NFL debut on November 26, 2006, with the Eagles against the Indianapolis Colts, almost forcing a fumble on his first play with a tackle. He ended up playing in 6 total games during the 2006 season and registered 5 total tackles. He was waived by the Eagles at the beginning of the 2007 season.

New York Giants
Daniels was signed to the New York Giants practice squad after being cut by the Eagles. He was waived by the Giants at the beginning of the 2008 season. In a playoff game against the Tampa Bay Buccaneers, Daniels forced a fumble.

Second stint with Philadelphia Eagles
During the 2008 season, Daniels re-signed with the Philadelphia Eagles. In his second stint in Philadelphia, Daniels notched 18 special teams tackles in 2008. He was waived during final cuts on September 5, 2009.

Jacksonville Jaguars
Daniels was signed by the Jacksonville Jaguars on December 21, 2009, after linebacker Clint Ingram was placed on injured reserve. Daniels was injured and subsequently placed on the injured reserve list on April 26, 2010.

External links
Jacksonville Jaguars bio
New York Giants bio
Philadelphia Eagles bio

1981 births
Living people
People from Monroe County, Arkansas
Players of American football from Arkansas
American football linebackers
Philadelphia Eagles players
New York Giants players
Jacksonville Jaguars players
Hartford Colonials players
Harding Bisons football players
Harding University alumni